The 1891–92 season was Ardwick A.F.C.'s first ever season of league football, joining the Football Alliance in its third and final year of existence.

Team Kit

Football Alliance

Results summary

N.B. Points awarded for a win: 2

Reports

Cup competitions

FA Cup

Lancashire Senior Cup

Manchester Senior Cup

Friendlies

Squad statistics

Squad
Appearances for competitive matches only

Scorers

All

League

FA cup

See also
Manchester City F.C. seasons

References

External links
Extensive Manchester City statistics site

Manchester City F.C. seasons
Ardwick A.F.C.